Alberto Guitián Ceballos (born 29 July 1990) is a Spanish footballer who plays for Bolivian side Club Bolívar. Mainly a central defender, he can also play as a central midfielder

Club career
Born in Los Corrales de Buelna, Cantabria, Guitián finished his formation with Racing de Santander. He made his senior debuts with the reserves in the 2008–09 campaign, in Segunda División B.

On 2 September 2013 Guitián moved to another reserve team, Sporting de Gijón B also in the third level. On 17 July of the following year, after featuring regularly, he signed a new one-year deal.

On 10 July 2015 Guitián was promoted to the main squad, newly promoted to La Liga. He was also converted to a central defender during the team's pre-season.

Guitián made his professional debut on 2 December, starting in a 0–2 Copa del Rey away loss against Real Betis. Late in the month he made his top tier debut, playing the full 90 minutes in a defeat at SD Eibar for the same scoreline.

On 1 February 2016, Guitián rescinded his contract with the Asturians and moved to Segunda División side Real Zaragoza. He scored his first professional goal on 2 April, netting his team's only in a 1–2 away loss against Elche CF.

On 17 June 2016, Guitián signed a three-year deal with Real Valladolid, also in the second tier. On 31 January 2018, he was loaned to Sporting de Gijón until the end of the season.

On 10 December 2018, after playing only one competitive match for the first half of the campaign, Guitián signed a two-and-a-half-year contract with Zaragoza, after cutting ties with Valladolid. He left the Aragonese side on 28 January 2021, after terminating his contract.

Guitián moved abroad for the first time in his career on 29 January 2021, after signing a contract with Bolivian side Club Bolívar.

References

External links

1990 births
Living people
Spanish footballers
Footballers from Cantabria
Association football defenders
Association football midfielders
Association football utility players
La Liga players
Segunda División players
Segunda División B players
Tercera División players
Rayo Cantabria players
Sporting de Gijón B players
Sporting de Gijón players
Real Zaragoza players
Real Valladolid players
Club Bolívar players
Spanish expatriate footballers
Spanish expatriate sportspeople in Bolivia
Expatriate footballers in Bolivia